Bernardo Tapia Montiel (born 7 July 1962) is a Spanish retired footballer who played as a midfielder, and is the current assistant manager of Deportivo de La Coruña.

Playing career
Born in Terrassa, Barcelona, Tapia finished his formation with Terrassa FC. He made his professional debut on 16 June 1979 at the age of just 16, starting in a 1–1 Segunda División home draw against Barakaldo CF, as his side was already relegated.

In 1981, Tapia joined UD Salamanca still in the second division; after featuring rarely, he was loaned to Segunda División B side Andorra CF the following year. Upon returning, he was assigned to the main squad in La Liga and made his debut in the category on 9 November 1983, playing the last 30 minutes in a 0–4 away loss against Real Sociedad.

Tapia left the Charros in 1985, and subsequently resumed his career in the third division by representing Algeciras CF, Albacete Balompié, CD Lugo, AEC Manlleu, UDA Gramenet and Terrassa. He retired with the latter in 1997, aged 34.

Managerial career
Immediately after retiring, Tapia took over Terrrassa's youth categories until 1999, when he was appointed technical director of the main squad. He also had two spells as an interim manager, with the side in the third division.

Tapia left the Egarenses in 2005, and was appointed UE Sant Andreu's assistant in 2007, after a stint as a scout. In the following year, he was appointed technical secretary, remaining with the role until 2011.

In June 2011, Tapia was appointed manager of lowly locals UD San Lorenzo in the regional leagues. He left the club in 2012, and joined another club he represented as a player, Manlleu, as an assistant of the Juvenil squad; in December of that year, he was named manager of the latter squad.

On 28 June 2014, Tapia was appointed Natxo González's assistant at CF Reus Deportiu. In 2017, he joined González's staff at Real Zaragoza, again as an assistant.

References

External links

1962 births
Living people
Footballers from Terrassa
Spanish footballers
Association football midfielders
La Liga players
Segunda División players
Segunda División B players
Terrassa FC footballers
UD Salamanca players
Algeciras CF footballers
Albacete Balompié players
CD Lugo players
AEC Manlleu footballers
Spanish football managers
Terrassa FC managers